Matt Sweeney (born July 2, 1969) is an American musician and record producer best known as a guitarist of Skunk, Chavez, and supergroup Zwan.

Early life and education 
Sweeney was born in New Jersey. His father was John D. Sweeney, a professor of Medieval English at Seton Hall University who was also an avid musician. His mother, Katharine Sweeney Hayden, is a federal judge. Sweeney's parents divorced after 20 years of marriage. He has an older brother, Gregory Sweeney, who is a musician who works on the TV show Kitchen Nightmares.

He grew up in Maplewood and South Orange, New Jersey. He attended Northwestern University before dropping out.

Career 
Sweeney's high school band Skunk released two albums on Twin/Tone records ("Last American Virgin" in 1989 and the posthumous "Laid", both out of print). In the nineties he recorded and performed as a singer and guitarist with math rock band Chavez, releasing a seven-inch ("Repeat the Ending" b/w "Hack the Sides Away") two albums (1995's Gone Glimmering and 1996's Ride the Fader) and one EP (1995"s Pentagram Ring) on the Matador label. Chavez did several short tours in the United States and Europe between 1994 and 1997. When Chavez slowed down Sweeney filled in on bass guitar for Guided By Voices on the "Under the Bushes, Under the Stars" tour. He also provided vocals on the song "Quicksilver" on Guided By Voices leader Robert Pollard's first solo album Not in My Airforce LP. The late '90s found him continuing to work a day job and touring with Bonnie 'Prince' Billy as a guitarist.

Sweeney's work has taken him across a variety of musical genres. Starting in 2000 he turned up on Cat Power's The Covers Record, playing guitar on "Salty Dog", and a couple of Bonnie "Prince" Billy singles (percussion on "A Whorehouse Is Any House" and guitar and vocals on "Little Boy Blue"). In 2001 he started playing and writing with Billy Corgan and Jimmy Chamberlin in what was to become Zwan. He collaborated with Billy Corgan on the soundtrack to the movie Spun, singing the movie's opening song, a cover of Iron Maiden's "Number of the Beast". He was also featured as a guitarist and backing vocalist on Bonnie "Prince" Billy's Ease Down The Road album. He lent a helping hand to Dave Grohl in assembling the all-star heavy metal album Probot, tracking down the legendary singers and providing some guitar work (the Probot album was not released until 2004, on Southern Lord records). Sweeney recorded and toured with Zwan from late 2001–2003. He is credited as providing guitar, vocal, and some songwriting on Zwan's album Mary Star of the Sea.

After Zwan's breakup, Sweeney played guitar with Bonnie "Prince" Billy for several tours in 2004. January 2005 saw the release of their collaboration Superwolf on Drag City. Sweeney and Bonnie toured behind the Superwolf record in the U.S. and Europe. 2005 also saw Sweeney producing heavy metal band Early Man's debut album, Closing In. The following year found Sweeney working in both the country music and hip-hop scenes, providing guitar work, along with Mike Campbell and Smokey Hormel, on the Johnny Cash album American V: A Hundred Highways and appearing with Yo La Tengo bass player James McNew and Def Jux founder El-P, as guest artists on the first track of rapper Cage's album Hell's Winter. He also played guitar on the Dixie Chicks' Taking the Long Way album. In addition, he became a member of apocalyptic Christian folk legends Current 93's touring group, playing shows in Europe in support of the Black Ships Ate The Sky album. He also recorded with longtime friend Andrew W.K. for W.K.'s Close Calls With Brick Walls album.

In 2007 Sweeney again collaborated with El-P, this time alongside Omar Rodríguez-López and Cedric Bixler-Zavala of Mars Volta, on El-P's 2007 album, I'll Sleep When You're Dead.

In early 2009 Sweeney formed The Brill Sisters with Andrew W.K. and producer Don Fleming. They played their first show (without Fleming) at Santos Party House on April 2, 2009. The entire group performed on April 21.

In 2016, Sweeney toured with Iggy Pop, Josh Homme as well as Matt Helders to support their album Post Pop Depression.

Production work 
Sweeney produced Dax Riggs' album We Sing of Only Blood or Love in 2007 for Fat Possum records.
In late 2007, along with Bonnie 'Prince" Billy, Sweeney produced Baby Dee's debut album for Drag City Records, Safe Inside the Day. The album was released in January 2008.

Sweeney is credited for "wry guitar licks" on an album for NYC heavy blues rockers Endless Boogie, called "Focus Level." It is rumored he produced the album as well. He also turned up on the Six Organs of Admittance's LP Shelter from the Ash. In addition, Sweeney has songwriting credit on certain pressings of Cat Power's Jukebox album, for "Song to Bobby." He is also credited as an additional guitarist on that album.

Session work 
In tune with his many collaborations, an unlikely combination of Sweeney and Neil Diamond was proposed by seminal producer Rick Rubin in 2008 to follow up Diamond's Rubin-produced 2005 album 12 Songs. The 2008 album Home Before Dark, released on May 12, features Sweeney on all songs.

Sweeney also plays guitar on Kid Rock's 2010 album Born Free.

Discography

Skunk 
Last American Virgin (1989) Twin/Tone
Laid (1990) Twin/Tone

Chavez 
Gone Glimmering (1995) Matador
Ride The Fader (1996) Matador
Better Days Will Haunt You best-of compilation CD/DVD (2006) Matador
Repeat the Ending EP (1994) Matador
Pentagram Ring EP (1995) Matador
What's Up Matador? feat. "Theme from 'For Russ (1995) Matador
School House Rock feat. "Little Twelve Toes" (1996) Atlantic Records
Boys Making Music, Music Making Men Documentary VHS (1996) Matador
Cockfighters EP (2017) Matador

Zwan 
Spun (Motion Picture Soundtrack) (2002)
Mary Star of The Sea (2003) Warner Bros.

Matt Sweeney & Bonnie 'Prince' Billy 
Superwolf (2005) Drag City
I Gave You (2005) EP Drag City
The Seedling Soundtrack feat. "Demon Lover" (2006)
Must Be Blind/Life In Muscle (2011) single Drag City
Superwolves (2021) Drag City

Producing 
Probot – by Probot – executive producer Sweeney (2004) Matador
Closing In – by Early Man – produced by Sweeney (2005) Matador
We Sing of Only Blood or Love – by Dax Riggs – produced by Sweeney (2007) Fat Possum
Safe Inside the Day – by Baby Dee – produced by Sweeney with Bonnie 'Prince' Billy (2008) Drag City
Focus Level – by Endless Boogie – uncredited production by Sweeney (2008) No Quarter
Full House Head – by Endless Boogie – uncredited production by Sweeney (2010) No Quarter
Sexual Harassment – by Turbonegro – produced by Sweeney (2012) Volcom Entertainment
Optimisme – by Songhoy Blues – produced by Sweeney (2020) Transgressive Records
I'll Be Your Mirror: A Tribute to The Velvet Underground & Nico – "European Son" produced by Sweeney (2021)

Other collaborations 
The Covers Record – by Cat Power – featuring Sweeney on guitar (2000) Matador
Spun motion picture soundtrack feat. "Number of the Beast" uncredited w/ William Corgan
Ease Down the Road – by Bonnie 'Prince' Billy – featuring Sweeney on guitar, vocals (2001) Palace Records
American V: A Hundred Highways – by Johnny Cash – featuring Sweeney on guitar (2006) American Recordings
Taking the Long Way – by The Dixie Chicks – featuring Sweeney on guitar (2006) Columbia
Close Calls with Brick Walls – by Andrew W.K. – featuring Sweeney on guitar, vocals (2007) Universal Japan
I'll Sleep When You're Dead – by El-P – featuring Sweeney on guitar (2007) Def Jux
Hell's Winter – by Cage Kennylz – featuring Sweeney on guitar (2005) Def Jux
Home Before Dark – by Neil Diamond – featuring Sweeney on guitar (2008) American Recordings
Shelter from the Ash – by Six Organs of Admittance – featuring Sweeney on guitar (2008) Drag City
Jukebox – by Cat Power – featuring Sweeney's guitar on "Song to Bobby" (2008) Matador
Birth Canal Blues Live – by Current 93 – featuring Sweeney on guitar (2008) Durtro
Leaving on a Mayday – by Anna Ternheim – featuring Sweeney on guitar on "Terrified", "Losing You", "Off the Road" and "Black Sunday Afternoon" (2008) Universal
Aleph at Hallucinatory Mountain – by Current 93 – featuring Sweeney on guitar (2009) Durtro
Cherish the Light Years – by Cold Cave – featuring Sweeney on bass guitar on "The Great Pan is Dead" (2011) Matador
21 – by Adele (2011) XL
Run the Jewels – by Run the Jewels – additional guitar on "No Come Down" (2013) Fool's Gold
Shangri La – by Jake Bugg – Rhythm Guitar on all tracks (2013) Mercury (UK)/Island (U.S.)
Run the Jewels 2 – by Run the Jewels – additional guitar on "All My Life" (2014) Mass Appeal
 False, True, Love – 2014 Whitney Biennial short film with Emily Sundblad, Sweeney, and Mariko Munro that features a cover version of the Shirley Collins song "False True Love"
 "Emmar" by Tinariwen (2014) guitar
 "Zipper Down" by Eagles of Death Metal (2015) additional guitar
 "Digging for Windows" by Zack de la Rocha (2016) additional guitar
 Elwan by Tinariwen (2017) additional guitar
 "Vols. 11 & 12" for The Desert Sessions (2019)
 Traditional Techniques by Stephen Malkmus (2020)
 RTJ4 – by Run the Jewels – additional vocals, performer, and guitar on "A Few Words for the Firing Squad (Radiation)"
 I'll Be Your Mirror: A Tribute to The Velvet Underground & Nico – bass guitar and electric guitars on "European Son" with Iggy Pop (2021)
Blind Date Party — by Bill Callahan & Bonnie "Prince" Billy — additional guitar on "OD'd in Denver" (2021) Drag City

References

External links 

 

American male singers
Living people
Drag City (record label) artists
Zwan members
Guitarists from New Jersey
American male guitarists
Chavez (band) members
1969 births